Paper Man (also known as Unlikely Hero) is a 2009 American independent comedy-drama film written and directed by Kieran and Michele Mulroney. The film stars Jeff Daniels as a struggling writer who relies on a childhood imaginary friend to help him with life decisions, Emma Stone as a 17-year-old high school student who befriends him, and Ryan Reynolds as the made up Captain Excellent.

Plot

This is a story about two people who, over the course of a winter, help each other grow and finally give up the imaginary friends that they each created for themselves from very young ages. Although initially they seem like very different people, they discover that in fact they do have this one thing in common and  develop  an almost father-daughter relationship.

Richard is a failed novelist who still talks to his imaginary superhero friend, Captain Excellent. At the urging of his wife Claire, Richard has moved to a Long Island beach community for the winter season in order to overcome his writer's block.

There, Richard meets 17-year-old Abby, who he sees while riding his rustic bike around town. He sees her light a fire in the trash can for no apparent reason. He decides to follow her. She confronts him, and Richard, trying not to appear as a pervert, hires her as a weekly babysitter, even though he has no children. Friday night she comes over to watch his "children" but he reveals to her that he has no children. Abby seems completely fine with it and Richard decides to spend his time at the pier, talking to Captain Excellent, who insists that Richard can never make a correct decision without his help. After returning from the pier, Richard comes home to find that Abby has made soup while he was away. He is awed by the fact that she has made this with her hands, as he has been having trouble in using his hands to make anything. He hires her again for the same time next week, though Captain Excellent states that it will only lead to bad things but Richard decides to ignore him. Their tenuous friendship is sparked by Richard's awe over Abby's youth and innocence and Abby's enjoyment of Richard's writing. They eventually grow so close that their relationships seems to be similar to that of a father and daughter. Abby tells Richard about the death of her twin sister, Amy, while Richard confides in her about his failing marriage. Meanwhile, Christopher, Abby's imaginary friend since Amy's death, watches her relationship with Richard grow, and though he feels neglected by Abby, all he wants is for her to be happy, no matter what that means for him. In the end Richard and Abby must face the reality of their lives, with Abby standing up to her loutish boyfriend and Richard bidding goodbye to Captain Excellent once and for all.

Cast
 Jeff Daniels as Richard Dunn
 Lisa Kudrow as Claire Dunn
 Ryan Reynolds as Captain Excellent
 Emma Stone as Abby
 Kieran Culkin as Christopher
 Hunter Parrish as Bryce
 Arabella Field as Lucy

Release
Paper Man was first shown at the 2009 Los Angeles Film Festival. MPI Media Group acquired the rights to show the film in North America and it was given a limited release on April 23, 2010.

The film was released with the new title Unlikely Hero in the United Kingdom on DVD by Signature Entertainment in April 2014. It has still not been released in any home video format in the United States. E1 films Canada released it on DVD 2010.

Critical reception
Paper Man received negative reviews from critics. Review aggregator website Rotten Tomatoes gives it a score of 32% based on 31 reviews with an average score of 4.73/10. Metacritic gives the film a score of 37% based on reviews from 15 critics.

Mick LaSalle of the San Francisco Chronicle called the film "listless, tepid, lifeless and fake". Kirk Honeycutt of The Hollywood Reporter said of it: "Off-kilter and awkward from the get-go, this comedy never finds any rhythm or reason".

See also
 Montauk, New York

References

External links
 
 
 
 
 
 

2009 films
2009 comedy-drama films
2009 independent films
American buddy films
American comedy-drama films
American independent films
Films about writers
Films about dysfunctional families
Films set in Long Island
Films shot in New York (state)
2000s English-language films
2000s American films